Julia Dubina (born 23 June 1984 in Tbilisi) is a Georgian triple jumper. She was selected to compete for the Georgian Olympic squad in the triple jump at the 2004 Summer Olympics, after leaping her own personal best and a national record of 14.03 metres from the athletics meet in Baku.

Dubina qualified for the Georgian squad in the women's triple jump at the 2004 Summer Olympics in Athens. Two months before the Games, she demolished the Georgian record of 14.03 metres to guarantee an Olympic B-standard from the athletics meet in Baku. During the prelims, Dubina spanned a satisfying 13.36-metre leap on her opening attempt, but her resilient effort was just worthily enough for the thirty-first position in a field of thirty-three athletes, failing to advance further to the final round.

References

External links

1984 births
Living people
Female triple jumpers from Georgia (country)
Olympic athletes of Georgia (country)
Athletes (track and field) at the 2004 Summer Olympics
Sportspeople from Tbilisi